Conus estivali is a species of sea snail, a marine gastropod mollusk in the family Conidae, the cone snails and their allies.

Like all species within the genus Conus, these snails are predatory and venomous. They are capable of "stinging" humans, therefore live ones should be handled carefully or not at all.

Description
The size of the shell attains 10 mm.

Distribution
This marine species occurs in the Coral Sea and off New Caledonia

References

 Röckel D., Richard G. & Moolenbeek R.G. (1995) Deep-water cones (Gastropoda: Conidae) from the New Caledonian region. In Bouchet P. (ed.). Résultats des Campagnes Musorstom 14. Mémoires du Muséum National d'Histoire Naturelle 167: 557–594.
 Puillandre N., Duda T.F., Meyer C., Olivera B.M. & Bouchet P. (2015). One, four or 100 genera? A new classification of the cone snails. Journal of Molluscan Studies. 81: 1–23

External links
 The Conus Biodiversity website
 Cone Shells – Knights of the Sea
 
 Holotype at MNHN, Paris

estivali
Gastropods described in 1995